The Aberlemno Sculptured Stones are a series of five Class I and II Early Medieval standing stones found in and around the village of Aberlemno, Angus, Scotland.

Location
Aberlemno 1, 3 and 5 are located in recesses in the dry stone wall at the side of the road in Aberlemno. Aberlemno 2 is found in the Kirkyard, 300 yards south of the roadside stones.() In recent years, bids have been made to move the stones to an indoor location to protect them from weathering, but this has met with local resistance and the stones are currently covered in the winter. The stones are covered with wooden boxes from the last working day of September until the first working day of April.

Aberlemno 4, the Flemington Farm Stone was found 30 yards from the church, and is now on display in the McManus Galleries, Dundee.

Description

Aberlemno 1

Aberlemno 1 is the central roadside stone. It is an unshaped standing stone, bearing incised Pictish symbols, defining it under J Romilly Allen and Joseph Anderson's classification system as a Class I stone. The symbols on one face: the serpent, the double disc and Z-rod and the mirror and comb.  The meaning of these symbols is unknown.  They are deeply incised in a bold, confident line, and this stone is considered to be one of the finest and best-preserved Pictish symbol stones still standing in or near its original position.  The other face of the stone exhibits prehistoric cup marks, showing that it has been re-used.

Aberlemno 2
Aberlemno II, found in Aberlemno kirkyard, is a shaped cross-slab, bearing Pictish symbols as well as Christian symbols in relief, defining it as a Class II stone.

The west face is inscribed with a quadrilobate Celtic Cross. The cross bears several styles of Celtic pattern designs. The vertical arms are inscribed with three separate knotwork designs, the horizontal arms with keywork designs. The central roundel has a spiral design composed of three interconnecting triskeles. Bordering the cross are a number of Celtic zoomorphic designs, reminiscent of Northumbrian designs and designs from the Book of Kells. A hole has been bored through the upper part of the stone some time after its sculpting.

The rear face features two Pictish symbols, a notched rectangle with z-rod and a triple disc. Below this are nine figures which have been interpreted as a narrative account of a battle.

Until recently, it was thought to date to the mid-8th century, but subsequent analysis has suggested a mid-9th century date.

Aberlemno 3

The western road-side stone is another Class II stone.  It has an elaborately decorated ringed cross flanked by adoring angels on one side, and a hunting scene on the reverse, below two large Pictish symbols. This stone is known as Aberlemno 3. This stone has until recently been thought to date from the late eighth century. More recent comparative analyses have suggested that it may be of a later, mid-ninth-century origin.

Aberlemno 3 has different proportions to the Kirkyard Cross-slab, being relatively tall and thin, with parallel sides which have incised decoration (those of the other cross-slab are plain). The monument's height and decoration on four faces both suggest it is later in date than Aberlemno 2. Its nearest artistic analogies appear to be sculptures from Easter Ross in northern Scotland, notable the Hilton of Cadboll stone (now in the Museum of Scotland), which has a closely similar hunting scene.

Aberlemno 4
This stone, found in 1961 is approximately 1.5 metres tall, 0.5 m wide and 0.3 m thick. It has incised symbols on an unworked stone, defining it under J Romilly Allen and Joseph Anderson's classification system as a Class I stone. There are two symbols, a horseshoe and a Pictish Beast. The anterior portion of the beast symbol (facing right) has suffered some damage due to ploughing, but is still easily visible.

Aberlemno 5
The eastern Class I stone is highly eroded and the incised symbols are extremely difficult to make out. This stone is thought to be unfinished or a later fake. This stone is known as Aberlemno 5.

The battle scene on Aberlemno 2

On the rear of Aberlemno 2 is a scene showing human figures bearing weapons, apparently engaged in battle. The figures appear in three rows. The top row has an unhelmeted figure on horseback riding behind a helmeted rider, possibly in pursuit. The helmeted rider is armed with a spear and appears to have dropped his sword and shield. The middle row has a helmeted rider armed with a spear and shield facing three unhelmeted infantry soldiers armed with spears, swords and shields. The bottom row shows a mounted and unhelmeted figure and mounted helmeted figure facing each other, both armed with spears. Behind the helmeted rider lies a helmeted casualty, with a bird to his right.

The battle scene has been interpreted in numerous ways. The earliest record of the stone by Hector Boece, from the 16th century, links the scene with the Battle of Barry (now known to be historically inauthentic):

82. Parem cladem nobilissimus Danorum manipulus est sortitus ad Aberlemnonem vicum vix a Bretheno, nunc civitate episcopali sede honestata, quatuor passuum millibus, qui a Scotis interceptus ibidem ferro occubuit. Quo loco ingens lapis est erectus. Huic animantium effigies nonnullis cum characteribus artificiose, ut tum fiebat, quae rem gestam posteritati annunciarent, sunt insculptae.
82. A noble company of Danes suffered a similar slaughter near the village of Aberlemno, a village four miles distant from Brechin (nowadays a city possessing the honour of an episcopal see), which was intercepted by the Scots and put to the sword. Here a great stone was erected, carved with lifelike figures and an artfully-engraved inscription (according to the lights of those days) to record this achievement for posterity.

This interpretation persisted well into the mid-19th century, some time after antiquarian George Chalmers identified Dunnichen as a possible site of the Battle of Dun Nechtain.

While it was noted in 1955 by Robert Stevenson, keeper of the Museum of Antiquities of Scotland, that the helmets depicted on the stone were of a general sub-Roman design and the helmeted figures were likely to be Picts, the superficial similarity of the helmets with their long nasal, with the Anglo-Saxon Coppergate Helmet found at York in 1982 has led to the notion that the helmeted figures are Northumbrians. This, coupled with the stone's proximity to Dunnichen ( to the south) led to the interpretation made by historian Graeme Cruickshank that the scene was a depiction of the Battle of Dun Nechtain.

Cruickshank's interpretation, published in 1985, 1300 years after the Battle of Dun Nechtain, received general acceptance, although he has been criticised for his suggestions that the stone was created soon after the battle in 685, when the conventional view at the time was that it was sculpted a century later.

The subsequent identification of Dunachton in Badenoch as a second candidate for the site of the battle, and the revised dating of the stone to the mid-9th century has weakened Cruickshank's argument somewhat, and alternative interpretations have been made, including that the scene depicts a battle between Picts and Vikings, or that it is a memorial to the 8th-century Pictish king Óengus I, or even that it represents a spiritual struggle.

Gallery

Notes

References

External links

 Historic Environemt Scotland: Visitor guide
 Aberlemno Stones: I, II, III, V
 Aberlemno Sculptured Stones

9th-century sculptures
Pictish stones
Pictish stones in Angus, Scotland
Sculpture series
Scheduled Ancient Monuments in Angus